Edmontosaurus regalis is a species of comb-crested hadrosaurid (duck-billed) dinosaur. Fossils of E. regalis have been found in rocks of western North America that date from the late Campanian stage of the Cretaceous Period 73 million years ago, but it may have possibly lived till the early Maastrichtian.

It is classified as a genus of saurolophine (or hadrosaurine) hadrosaurid, a member of the group of hadrosaurids which lacked large, hollow crests, instead having smaller solid crests or fleshy combs. The distribution of E. regalis fossils suggests that it preferred coasts and coastal plains. It was a herbivore that could move on both two legs and four. Because it is known from several bone beds, E. regalis is thought to have lived in groups. The wealth of fossils has allowed researchers to study its paleobiology in detail, including its brain, how it may have fed, and its injuries and pathologies.

Description

Edmontosaurus regalis is known from several fossil specimens. E. regalis was among the largest hadrosaurids. A 2022 study proposed that E. regalis may have been heavier than E. annectens, but not enough samples exist to provide a valid estimate and examination on its osteohistology and growth, so the results for E. regalis aren't statistically significant.

The skull was roughly triangular in profile. One specimen preserved a soft tissue crest or wattle on the head. The beak was toothless, and both the upper and lower beaks were extended by keratinous material. Teeth were present only in the maxillae (upper cheeks) and dentaries (main bone of the lower jaw). They grew in columns, with an observed maximum of six in each, and the number of columns varied based on the animal's size. There were 51 to 53 columns per maxilla and 48 to 49 per dentary (teeth of the upper jaw being slightly narrower than those in the lower jaw).

E. regalis had thirteen neck vertebrae, eighteen back vertebrae, nine hip vertebrae, and an unknown number of tail vertebrae. The fore legs were shorter and less heavily built than the hind legs. Each hand had four fingers, with no thumb (first finger). The index second, third, and fourth fingers were approximately the same length and were united in life within a fleshy covering. Although the second and third finger had hoof-like claws, these bones were also within the skin and not apparent from the outside. The little finger was separate from the other three and was much shorter.  Each foot had three toes, with no big toe or little toe. The toes had hoof-like tips.

Discovery and history

The first known fossil remains that may belong to Edmontosaurus regalis were named Trachodon cavatus in 1871 by Edward Drinker Cope (the name is spelled in more recent sources as Trachodon avatus or even Trachodon atavus). This species was assessed without comment as a synonym of Edmontosaurus regalis in two reviews, although atavus predates regalis by several decades. In 1874 Cope named but did not describe Agathaumas milo for a sacral vertebra and shin fragments from the late Maastrichtian-age Upper Cretaceous Laramie Formation of Colorado. Later that same year, he described these bones under the name Hadrosaurus occidentalis. The bones are now lost. As with Trachodon atavus, Agathaumas milo has been assigned without comment to Edmontosaurus regalis in two reviews, although predating regalis by several decades. Neither species has attracted much attention; both are absent from Lull and Wright's 1942 monograph, for example. A third obscure early species, Trachodon selwyni, described by Lawrence Lambe in 1902 for a lower jaw from what is now known as the Dinosaur Park Formation of Alberta, was erroneously described by Glut (1997) as having been assigned to Edmontosaurus regalis by Lull and Wright. It was not, instead being designated "of very doubtful validity." More recent reviews of hadrosaurids have concurred.

The type specimen of E. regalis is NMC 2288, consisting of a skull, articulated vertebrae up to the sixth tail vertebra, ribs, partial hips, an upper arm bone, and most of a hind limb. It was discovered in 1912 by Levi Sternberg. The second specimen, paratype NMC 2289, consists of a skull and skeleton lacking the beak, most of the tail, and part of the feet. It was discovered in 1916 by George F. Sternberg. Both skeletons were found in the Horseshoe Canyon Formation (formerly the lower Edmonton Formation) along the Red Deer River of southern Alberta, Canada. The Edmonton Formation lent Edmontosaurus its name. The name Edmontosaurus regalis (meaning "regal," or, more loosely, "king-sized"), was coined in 1917 by Lawrence Lambe. Lambe found that his new dinosaur compared best to "Diclonius mirabilis" specimens (now assigned to Edmontosaurus annectens), and drew attention to the size and robustness of Edmontosaurus regalis. Initially, Lambe only described the skulls of the two skeletons, but returned to the genus in 1920 to describe the skeleton of NMC 2289. The postcrania of the type specimen remains undescribed, still in its plaster jackets.
 
Two more species that would come to be included with Edmontosaurus regalis were named from Canadian remains in the 1920s, but both would initially be assigned to the genus Thespesius. Gilmore named the first, Thespesius edmontoni, in 1924. T. edmontoni also came from the Horseshoe Canyon Formation. It was based on NMC 8399, another nearly complete skeleton lacking most of the tail.  NMC 8399 was discovered on the Red Deer River in 1912 by a Sternberg party.  Its forelimbs, ossified tendons, and skin impressions were briefly described in 1913 and 1914 by Lambe, who at first thought it was an example of a species he'd named Trachodon marginatus, but then changed his mind. The specimen became the first dinosaur skeleton to be mounted for exhibition in a Canadian museum.  Gilmore found that his new species compared closely to what he called Thespesius annectens, but left the two apart because of details of the arms and hands.  He also noted that his species had more vertebrae than Marsh's in the back and neck, but proposed that Marsh was mistaken in assuming that the annectens specimens were complete in those regions.

In 1926, Charles Mortram Sternberg named Thespesius saskatchewanensis for NMC 8509, a skull and partial skeleton from the Wood Mountain plateau of southern Saskatchewan. He had collected this specimen in 1921, from rocks that were assigned to the Lance Formation, now the Frenchman Formation. NMC 8509 included an almost complete skull, numerous vertebrae, partial shoulder and hip girdles, and partial hind limbs, representing the first substantial dinosaur specimen recovered from Saskatchewan. Sternberg opted to assign it to Thespesius because that was the only hadrosaurid genus known from the Lance Formation at the time.

Classification
 
 
The cladogram below follows Godefroit et al. (2012) analysis.

Paleobiology 
 
In a 2011 study, Campione and Evans recorded data from all known edmontosaur skulls and used it to plot a morphometric graph, comparing variable features of the skull with skull size. Their results showed that within Edmontosaurus regalis, many features previously used to classify additional species were directly correlated with skull size. Campione and Evans interpreted these results as strongly suggesting that the shape of E. regalis skulls changed dramatically as they grew. This has led to several apparent mistakes in classification in the past. The Campanian species Thespesius edmontoni, previously considered a synonym of E. annectens due to its small size and skull shape, is more likely a subadult specimen of the contemporary E. regalis. In a 2014 study, researchers proposed that E. regalis reached maturity in 10-15 years of age. A preserved rhamphotheca present in specimen LACM 23502, housed in the Los Angeles County Museum, also indicates the beak of the related Edmontosaurus annectens was more hook-shaped and extensive than many illustrations in scientific and public media have previously depicted. Whether this was true of E. regalis as well is not known as of this time.

Extensive bone beds are known for Edmontosaurus regalis, and such groupings of hadrosaurids are used to suggest that they were gregarious, living in groups. Two quarries containing E. regalis remains were identified in a 2007 database of fossil bone beds, from Alaska (Prince Creek Formation), and Alberta (Horseshoe Canyon Formation).

Paleoecology

The Edmontonian land vertebrate age is defined by the first appearance of Edmontosaurus regalis in the fossil record. Although sometimes reported as of exclusively early Maastrichtian age, the Horseshoe Canyon Formation was of somewhat longer duration.  Deposition began approximately 73 million years ago, in the late Campanian, and ended between 68.0 and 67.6 million years ago. Edmontosaurus regalis is known from the lowest of five units within the Horseshoe Canyon Formation, but is absent from at least the second to the top.

Because of its wide distribution, which covers a distance from Alaska to Colorado and includes polar settings that would have had little light during a significant part of the year, Edmontosaurus regalis has been considered possibly migratory. A 2008 review of dinosaur migration studies by Phil R. Bell and Eric Snively proposed that E. regalis was capable of an annual  round-trip journey, provided it had the requisite metabolism and fat deposition rates. The possible migratory nature of E. regalis contrasts with many other dinosaurs, such as theropods, sauropods, and ankylosaurians, which Bell and Snively found were more likely to have overwintered. In contrast to Bell and Snively, Anusuya Chinsamy and colleagues concluded from a study of bone microstructure that polar edmontosaurs overwintered.

Contemporary fauna
As many as three quarters of the dinosaur specimens from badlands near Drumheller, Alberta may pertain to Edmontosaurus regalis. The Horseshoe Canyon Formation is interpreted as having a significant marine influence, due to an encroaching Western Interior Seaway, the shallow sea that covered the midsection of North America through much of the Cretaceous. E. regalis shared the setting with fellow hadrosaurids Hypacrosaurus and Saurolophus, parksosaurid Parksosaurus, ceratopsids Montanoceratops, Anchiceratops, Arrhinoceratops, and Pachyrhinosaurus, pachycephalosaurid Stegoceras, ankylosaurid Euoplocephalus, nodosaurid Edmontonia, ornithomimids Ornithomimus and Struthiomimus, a variety of poorly known small theropods including troodontids and dromaeosaurids, and the tyrannosaurids Albertosaurus and Daspletosaurus.

Edmontosaurus is found in coastal, near-marine settings, while Hypacrosaurus and Saurolophus are found in more continental lowlands. Edmontosaurus and Saurolophus are not usually found together. The typical edmontosaur habitat of this formation has been described as the back regions of bald cypress swamps and peat bogs on delta coasts.  Pachyrhinosaurus also preferred this habitat to the floodplains dominated by Hypacrosaurus, Saurolophus, Anchiceratops and Arrhinoceratops. The Edmontonian-age coastal Pachyrhinosaurus-Edmontosaurus association is recognized as far north as Alaska.

See also
 Timeline of hadrosaur research
Edmontosaurus annectens

References

Late Cretaceous dinosaurs of North America
Saurolophines
Horseshoe Canyon fauna
Paleontology in Alberta
Paleontology in Colorado
Paleontology in Saskatchewan
Campanian species first appearances